The 1820 Ohio gubernatorial election was held on October 10, 1820.

Incumbent Democratic-Republican Governor Ethan Allen Brown defeated former U.S. Senator Jeremiah Morrow and former U.S. Representative William Henry Harrison.

General election

Results

Notes

References

1820
Ohio
Gubernatorial